Fossorochromis rostratus is a species of cichlid fish that is endemic to Lake Malawi in East Africa.

It feeds on small invertebrates that often are caught by sifting mouthfuls of sand. As for most cichlids, brood care is highly developed, the eggs and larvae being mouthbrooded by the female.

References

Haplochromini
Fish of Lake Malawi
Fish described in 1899
Taxa named by George Albert Boulenger
Taxonomy articles created by Polbot